Isochaetes is a genus of Limacodid moths.

Selected species
Isochaetes beutenmuelleri (H. Edwards, 1889)
Isochaetes dwagsi Corrales & Epstein, 2004
Isochaetes heevansi Epstein, 2004
Isochaetes kenjii Corrales & Epstein, 2004
Isochaetes tapantiensis Corrales & Epstein, 2004

External links

Isochaetes at funet

Limacodidae genera
Limacodidae